Charles Gaines may refer to:
 Charles Gaines (writer)
 Charles Gaines (artist)
 Charles Gaines (American football)
 Charles Gaines (basketball)

See also
 Charlie Gaines, American jazz trumpeter and bandleader